The Impostor (aka Strange Confession) is a 1944 American drama war film directed by Julien Duvivier and starring Jean Gabin.

Plot
Clement (Gabin), a condemned murderer literally minutes away from the guillotine, is "liberated" when the Nazis bomb the French jail that holds him. During his escape he steals the uniform and identification papers of a dead French soldier. He then hides from the law by joining the Free French Forces in French Equatorial Africa. Clement's new identity and purpose in life reform him. In the end he sacrifices himself in service of his country.

Cast
 Jean Gabin as Clement / Maurice LeFarge
 Richard Whorf as Lt. Vareene 
 Allyn Joslyn as Bouteau 
 Ellen Drew as Yvonne 
 Peter Van Eyck as Hafner 
 Ralph Morgan as Col. De Bolvin 
 Eddie Quillan as Cochery 
 John Qualen as Monge 
 Dennis Moore as Maurice LaFarge 
 Milburn Stone as Clauzel 
 John Philliber as Mortemart
 Charles McGraw as Menessier
 Otho Gaines as Matowa 
 John Forrest as Free French corporal 
 Fritz Leiber as Priest 
 Ian Wolfe as Sgt. Clerk 
 William B. Davidson as Adjutant 
 Frank Wilcox as Prosecutor 
 Warren Ashe as Officer 
 Peter Cookson as Soldier 
 Leigh Whipper as Toba 
 Ernest Whitman as Ekoua 
 Grandon Rhodes as Captain 
 George Irving as Prosecutor

References

External links
 
 
 
 

1944 films
1940s war drama films
American war drama films
American black-and-white films
1940s English-language films
Films directed by Julien Duvivier
Films scored by Dimitri Tiomkin
World War II films made in wartime
Films set in the French colonial empire
Films set in Chad
Films set in the Republic of the Congo
North African campaign films
Films about capital punishment
Films about identity theft
Universal Pictures films
1944 drama films